Cryptospora is a genus of flowering plants belonging to the family Brassicaceae.

Its native range is Western and Central Asia to Northwestern China.

Species:

Cryptospora falcata 
Cryptospora inconspicua 
Cryptospora trichocarpa

References

Brassicaceae
Brassicaceae genera